Batina is a port village on the right bank of the Danube in Baranja, Croatia. Its elevation is 105 m. Administratively, it is located in the Draž municipality within the Osijek-Baranja County.

Geography

Batina is located on the D212 state road connecting the village to the city of Osijek. In 1974 the road bridge over the Danube was built. It is a state border crossing.

History

The village is known as the site of World War II Battle of Batina which took place from 11 to 29 November 1944. It was a battle between the units of the Red Army and the People's Liberation Army against the Wehrmacht and their allies. Today, a memorial site commemorates the battle which was one of the bloodiest World War II battles on Yugoslav soil.

See also
Osijek-Baranja county
Baranja

References

External links

Populated places in Osijek-Baranja County
Baranya (region)
Croatia–Serbia border